The 1809 New Hampshire gubernatorial election took place on March 14, 1809. Incumbent Democratic-Republican Governor John Langdon was defeated for re-election by Federalist candidate, Chief Justice of the New Hampshire Superior Court of Judicature Jeremiah Smith.

General election

Candidates
John Langdon, Democratic-Republican, incumbent Governor
Jeremiah Smith, Federalist, Chief Justice of the New Hampshire Superior Court of Judicature

Results

References

Notes 

Gubernatorial
New Hampshire
1809